Leigh Lake Ranger Patrol Cabin was designed and built by the U.S. Forest Service in the 1920s. The cabin is located northwest of Leigh Lake in Grand Teton National Park in the U.S. state of Wyoming. The cabin was built to a standardized design, similar to that used for the Moran Bay Patrol Cabin.   The cabin was acquired by the National Park Service upon the designation of Grand Teton National Park on February 26, 1929, and placed on the National Register of Historic Places on April 23, 1990. The cabin is still in use by the National Park Service.

The Leigh Lake cabin was listed on the National Register of Historic Places on April 23, 1990.

See also
 Historical buildings and structures of Grand Teton National Park

References

External links

Leigh Lake Patrol Cabin at the Wyoming State Historic Preservation Office
The Northern Backcountry Patrol Cabins of Grand Teton National Park Iowa State University

Buildings and structures in Grand Teton National Park
Log cabins in the United States
Rustic architecture in Wyoming
United States Forest Service ranger stations
National Park Service ranger stations
Log buildings and structures on the National Register of Historic Places in Wyoming
National Register of Historic Places in Grand Teton National Park
1920s establishments in Wyoming